The US Open Series is the name given by the United States Tennis Association (USTA) to a series of North American professional tennis tournaments leading up to and including the US Open. It is part of the "North American hard court season". Emirates sponsored the series in the past, under a deal in place from 2012 to 2016. The series was initially organized in 2004 as a way to focus more attention on American tennis tournaments by getting more of them on domestic television.  Until 2004, most summer North American tournaments were not on television, the exceptions being the prominent ATP Tour Masters 1000 events in Canada and Cincinnati. Since the inception of the series, Rafael Nadal is the only tennis player to win Canada, Cincinnati, and the US Open in a calendar year (2013), a feat referred to as the "Summer Slam" or the "North American Hardcourt Slam".

Under the US Open's broadcast rights, ESPN held domestic rights to all US Open Series events from 2015 to 2019. The eight non-Masters tournaments receive about 50 hours of television combined – about two hours on each day of their final weekends, chiefly on ESPN2. The dual-gender Washington D.C. Citi Open (the only ATP 500-level tournament in North America), which had been a part of the series since its 2004 founding, withdrew from the series for its 2015 edition due to frustrations over this lack of coverage; that tournament sold its exclusive coverage to Tennis Channel. The tournament re-joined the US Open Series in 2019. Since 2017, Tennis Channel broadcasts the US Open Series.

Bonus Challenge 
Players earn points for the US Open Series Bonus Challenge in order to win a bonus on top of the individual series tournaments' prize money, according to their results in these events. More points are awarded at some of the events, such as the ATP World Tour Masters 1000 and WTA Premier 5 events.  The three male and three female players with the most points in the US Open Series Bonus Challenge earn a money purse. The amount depends on their US Open Series placement and US Open result. If both are won then the bonus is $1 million as of 2010.Lleyton Hewitt and Lindsay Davenport were the top point-getters in 2004, Andy Roddick and Kim Clijsters won in 2005, and Andy Roddick and Ana Ivanovic won in 2006. Defending US Open champions Roger Federer and Maria Sharapova won in 2007.In 2005, whereas Roddick was upset in the first round against Gilles Müller at the Open, Clijsters became the first player to win both the US Open Series and the US Open, receiving $2.2 million, at the time the largest payday in women's sports. Clijsters defeated Frenchwoman Mary Pierce in straight sets: 6–3, 6–1. In 2010 she won $2.2 million again, this time $1.7 million for the US Open title and $500,000 in bonus for second place in the US Open Series. In 2007, Federer became the first male player and the second player overall to win the US Open Series and go on to win the US Open, winning $1.4 million plus the US Open Series bonus of $1 million, bringing his prize winning total to $2.4 million. This topped Clijsters' $2.2 million as the biggest US Open payday to date. In 2013, Serena Williams and Rafael Nadal both won the US Open after also winning the US Open Series. Due to several considerable prize money increments over the years, Serena Williams and Rafael Nadal surpassed Roger Federer's Us Open series payday record by winning $3.6 million each, and they shared the record for the largest prize money paycheck in tennis history for a single tennis tournament. In 2014, Serena Williams would repeat her previous year performance in winning both the US Open Series and the US Open. She now stands alone in the record for the biggest payday in tennis history, with a total amount of $4 million. Starting from 2017, the US Open Series will not feature a Bonus Challenge.

Series tournaments

Tournaments

In 2021, the US Open Series comprises the following tournaments:

Points distribution

2008–2016

2006–2007

2004–2005

Past tournament winners

Men

Women

Series standings + performance at the US Open
Note: From 2006 on, only players who earned points in at least two US Open Series events are eligible for the final (Top 3) standings.

1 – Hewitt and Davenport finished first in 2004 final standings based on more match wins in US Open Series events.
2 – Nadal finished third in 2005 (over Roger Federer) based on more set wins in US Open Series events.
3 – Schnyder was placed third in 2007 because Justine Henin (who had more points – 100 for winning Toronto) only played one tournament and was therefore not eligible for the top three positions.
4 – Nadal won the 2008 series ahead of Murray because Nadal defeated Murray in Toronto, Canada.
5 – Pennetta finished second in the 2009 final standings based on more match wins in US Open Series events.
6 – Murray won the 2010 series ahead of Federer because Murray defeated Federer in Toronto.
7 – Kuznetsova finished third in 2010 (over Victoria Azarenka and Maria Sharapova) based on more games won in US Open Series events (all three won 9 matches and 19 sets).
8 – Radwańska finished second in the 2011 final standings based on more match wins in US Open Series events.
9 – Players who had their point totals doubled due to having obtained points in at least three different events, based on a rule enforced from 2014 on.
10 – Dimitrov finished second in the 2016 final standings based on more match wins in US Open Series events.

Records
 Players who won both the US Open Series and the US Open in the same year, receiving $1 million bonus prize money
 Men: Roger Federer (2007) & Rafael Nadal (2013).
 Women: Kim Clijsters (2005*) & Serena Williams (2013, 2014).
   * - Clijsters received the Champion's prize money, $1.1M, plus a bonus equaling the prize money, $1.1M, for a total of $2.2M.
 Most points won
Without doubling bonus for three countable tournaments (until 2013):
 Men: Mardy Fish, 230 points in 2011.
 Women: Kim Clijsters, 225 points in 2005.
With doubling bonus for three countable tournaments (since 2014):
 Men: Milos Raonic, 280 points in 2014.
 Women: Serena Williams, 430 points in 2014.
 Most US Open Series overall victories
 Men: 2, Andy Roddick (2005, 2006); Rafael Nadal (2008, 2013); Andy Murray (2010, 2015).
 Women: 3, Serena Williams (2011, 2013, 2014).
 Most US Open Series Top-3 finishes
 Men: 5, Andy Murray (2006, 2008, 2009, 2010, 2015) & John Isner (2011, 2012, 2013, 2014, 2015).
 Women: 4, Serena Williams (2011, 2013, 2014, 2015) & Agnieszka Radwańska (2011, 2013, 2014, 2016).
 Most US Open Series tournament victories
 Men: 9, Roger Federer
 Women: 7, Serena Williams
 Biggest payout in the series (which were the largest in tennis history until Ashleigh Barty won US$4.42 at the WTA Finals in 2019)
Serena Williams (2014) – $4 million (won US Open Series and US Open).
 Biggest payout in men's: Novak Djokovic (2015) – $3.8 million (US Open Series runner-up and US Open winner). 
 Most successful nation in the US Open Series
 Overall: USA, 38 tournament victories (Men: 24 & Women: 14).
 Men: USA, 24 tournament victories.
 Women: USA, 14 tournament victories.

References

External links
 US Open Series official website

 
Tennis tournaments in the United States
Tennis tours and series